The European Resuscitation Council (ERC) is the European Interdisciplinary Council for Resuscitation Medicine and Emergency Medical Care. It was established in 1989.

The ERC's objective is "To preserve human life by making high quality resuscitation available to all".

The ERC is the network of National Resuscitation Councils in Europe.

Chair of the ERC is Koen Monsieurs.

References

External links
Official site

Emergency medicine organisations
Organizations established in 1989
International medical associations of Europe